= Pura Gambhirshah =

Pura Gambhirshah is a village in Garwara, Uttar Pradesh, India.
